Rob  Valentino (born December 21, 1985) is a former American soccer player who is an assistant coach at Major League Soccer side Atlanta United FC.

Career

College and Amateur
Valentino grew up in Danville, California, and began his soccer career playing youth soccer for the local Mustang Club. In 1999, his family moved to Arizona, where he played for the 1986 Sereno Golden Eagles with coach Harry Demos. Valentino was recruited out of high school, and chose to attend the University of San Francisco. Valentino was captain all four years at USF, where he was the WCC Defensive Player of the Year his sophomore season.  He also earned WCC Player of the Year honors his junior season.

In addition to playing collegiate soccer, Valentino spent the 2007 season with the San Jose Frogs of the USL Premier Development League. However, he injured his left knee and was set to red-shirt the season, but ultimately decided to sign a generation Adidas contract.

Professional
Valentino was drafted in the first round, 13th overall, of the 2008 MLS SuperDraft by New England Revolution. He made his full professional debut for Revolution on July 1, 2008, in a US Open Cup third round game against Richmond Kickers, and was traded to Colorado Rapids in exchange for Nico Colaluca on May 6, 2009. Valentino asked for and was released before the 2010 season to play for Tampa without ever making an MLS appearance.

He signed with FC Tampa Bay of the USSF Division 2 League in 2010, but chose not to re-sign with the club at the end of the season.

He later signed with new USL Pro franchise Orlando City on March 31, 2011; he scored his first career goal on April 16, 2011 in a 1–0 victory over the Charlotte Eagles. In addition Valentino was voted Defensive Player of the year for the 2011 USL season. He also became the captain for Orlando City following his debut season. Valentino played for Orlando City for 5 years, but was not among the Orlando City players to make the move to MLS.

Following Orlando City's move to MLS Valentino signed with Arizona United and was named captain for the team. He started in all 15 games for which he was fit. He missed a month of the season due to injury. Arizona announced that Valentino would retire from playing on August 11, 2015.

Coaching
On August 11, 2015, Valentino was announced as an assistant coach for the Central Florida USL team that begins play in 2016. The USL club is owned by Orlando City SC and reunited Valentino with his former teammate Anthony Pulis who was the team's head coach. He was also named to the club's technical staff.

In 2019 he was added to Frank De Boer’s technical staff as an assistant manager to the 2018 MLS Cup-winning team Atlanta United FC.

On July 18, 2021, Valentino was named Atlanta United's interim head coach following the firing of previous head coach Gabriel Heinze. When Gonzalo Pineda was hired as the new head coach on August 12, Valentino was retained as an assistant.

Honors

Orlando City
USL Pro (2): 2011, 2013

References

External links
 MLS player profile

1985 births
Living people
People from Cave Creek, Arizona
Sportspeople from the Phoenix metropolitan area
Soccer players from Arizona
American soccer players
Association football defenders
San Francisco Dons men's soccer players
San Jose Frogs players
New England Revolution draft picks
New England Revolution players
Colorado Rapids players
Tampa Bay Rowdies players
Orlando City SC (2010–2014) players
Phoenix Rising FC players
Orlando City B players
USL League Two players
USSF Division 2 Professional League players
USL Championship players
United States men's under-23 international soccer players
American soccer coaches
Orlando City B coaches
Atlanta United 2 coaches
Atlanta United FC coaches